The Robur LO 3000 is a 3-ton lorry made by the East German industrial vehicle manufacturer VEB Robur-Werke Zittau from 1973 until 1984. The vehicle was sold under IFA's Robur brand. It is the civilian rear-wheel drive Robur model of its time, and was produced alongside the all-wheel drive Robur LO 2002 A model. The LO 3000 is powered by an air-cooled Otto (petrol) engine; a dieselised version of the LO 3000, called the LD 3000, was made from 1982 until 1984, albeit in small numbers. As with its predecessors, the LO 3000 was made in several different versions. The VEB made the vehicle with two different wheelbase options, and offered more than twenty different body styles, including a bus version.

Compared with its predecessor, the LO 3000 has a more powerful engine, ball-and-nut steering, an improved braking system, and thus a higher payload. From 1972 until 1979, the East German design bureaus designed a successor for the Robur LO 3000 – alongside the IFA L60 –, the O611/D609. Despite this design's progression to a point where it could have been put into series production, it was abandoned in favour of keeping the LO 3000 in production. In 1985, the LO 3000 was eventually replaced by the LO 3001, a version of the LO 3000 with minor modifications such as smaller wheels and a skid plate.

Technical description 

The LO 3000 is a small, two-axle lorry designed for a payload of 3000 kg. It is based upon a conventional forward control, body-on-frame design with a longitudinally mounted front engine, and rear-wheel drive. The frame is a flexible ladder frame welded together from two U-profile longitudinal members with four round cross members, two U-profile cross members, and a rear cross member designed for a trailer hitch; the maximum permissible trailer mass is 2600 kg. In front, the LO 3000 has a forged stub axle (dead beam axle), in rear it has a simple tubular type live axle that consists of two axle tubes that are flanged to the axle's differential gearbox. Both axles are leaf-sprung and fitted with two hydraulic shock absorbers each. The steering system is a conventional ball-and-nut system. Untypical of a lorry, the LO 3000 has a vacuum-assisted hydraulic dual-circuit braking system with – typical of a 3-ton lorry – duo servo drum brakes. Unlike its off-road lookalikes, the LO 3000 has tapered bead seat rims and 6.50–20 inch crossply tyres.

The lorry is powered by an LO 4/2 Otto (petrol) engine. The LO 4/2 is an air-cooled, 3.345 dm3, straight-four, four-stroke engine with a cast iron crankcase, four finned single cylinders, and four crossflow cylinder heads. It has a forged crankshaft with three bearings, aluminium pistons, and a chain-driven camshaft that is located in the crankcase. Each cylinder head has high-squish combustion chambers, and is fitted with two overhead valves. The LO 4/2 engine has a BVF 36 F1–8 downdraught carburettor. From the engine, the torque is sent through a dry single-disc clutch to a WF23K1S4M five-speed manual constant-mesh gearbox, designed for an input torque of 226 N·m. It has synchromesh on all gears except first and reverse.

Technical specifications

References

External links 

Robur trucks
IFA vehicles
Vehicles introduced in 1973